Rehab Addict is a television show documenting home renovations, which airs on DIY and HGTV. Rehab Addict debuted on the DIY network on October 14, 2010. Beginning in January 2014, Season 4, was moved to airing on HGTV's prime time schedule.

Host
Nicole Curtis (b. August 20, 1976) advocates for the preservation and restoration of existing architecture over demolition when feasible. She has rehabbed homes in Saint Paul, Minnesota; Minneapolis, Minnesota; Lake Orion, Michigan; Detroit, Michigan; and Akron, Ohio. Her work centers on pre-World War II homes, and her renovation philosophy is to "restore old homes to their former glory" rather than modernization.

Curtis grew up in Lake Orion, Michigan and graduated from Lake Orion High School in 1994. Her family owned a garbage business. She attended college in Georgia, Florida, and Michigan and had her son, Ethan, before she graduated.  she lives in a renovated 1904 home in Detroit. Curtis originally intended to study law in college but later switched to education.

Curtis announced in July 2015 that she was expecting her second child and later that year gave birth to a son, Harper.

Seasons

Spin-Off
On July 1, 2020, it was announced that a spin-off titled Rehab Addict Rescue will premiere on January 28, 2021.

References

External links
DIY Network biography

2010 American television series debuts
2010s American reality television series
HGTV original programming
English-language television shows